CoolBrands may refer to:
 CoolBrands International, a former Canadian frozen foods and desserts manufacturer. 
 Swisher Hygiene, a sanitation company which is using the former CoolBrands International public stock listing through a reverse takeover.